Asato may refer to:

Asatō Line, a Japanese railway line
Asato Station, a railway station in Naha, Okinawa Prefecture, Japan
Kadjeto-Asato, a town in the Volta Region, Ghana

People with the given name
, Japanese women's footballer

People with the surname
, Ryukyuan karateka
, Japanese novelist
Mateus Asato, is a guitarist 
Olga Asato, Peruvian volleyball player
Jessica Asato, British politician
Jim Asato, American football coach
, Japanese film director
, Japanese voice actor

Japanese-language surnames
Japanese masculine given names